Nikola Kołodziejczyk (born 1986 in Krakow) is a Polish jazz pianist, composer, arranger and conductor.

Kołodziejczyk graduated from and is a former faculty member of the Academy of Music in Katowice. His teachers have included Irena Rolanowska, Andrzej Jagodziński, Emilian Madey, Edward Anthony Partyka and Wojciech Niedziela.

He leads a jazz orchestra, the Nikola Kołodziejczyk Orchestra. In 2014 they recorded and released their debut album entitled Chord Nation, which led to a Fryderyk award in 2015 for 'Best Jazz Debut' and three nominations. His second album entitled Barok Progresywny was awarded the Fryderyk 2016 for 'the Album of the Year'.  He is co-leader of the jazz trio Stryjo which plays live-improvised music. Kołodziejczyk together with Michał Tomaszczyk co-founded the Warsaw-based Konglomerat Big Band, whose debut album Albo Inaczej was certified gold.

Nikola Kołodziejczyk Orchestra 
 Benny Brown - lead trumpet
 Erwin Żebro - trumpet
 Oskar Torök - trumpet
 Štěpánka Balcarová - trumpet
 Paweł Niewiadomski - trombone
 Marcin Wołowiec - trombone
 Mateusz Łysoń - trombone
 Mateusz Mendyka - bass trombone
 Ewelina Serafin - flute
 Szymon Kamykowski - soprano saxophone
 Dawid Główczewski - alto saxophone
 Mariusz Pędziałek - English horn
 Przemysław Florczak - tenor saxophone
 Marek Pospieszalski - tenor saxophone
 Grzegorz Grzeszczyk - bass clarinet
 Ala Sierpińska - violin
 Leszek Dzierżęga - violin
 Wojciech Witek - viola
 Marta Sołek-Młynarczyk - cello
 Marta Gabriela Nagawiecka - cello
 Gabriela Rudawska - vocal
 Bartek Pieszka - vibraphone
 Jazz trio Stryjo:
 Maciej Szczyciński - double bass
 Michał Bryndal - drums
 Nikola Kołodziejczyk - piano, conductor

Discography 
 2014: Chord Nation (For-Tune)
 2015: Barok Progresywny

Awards and nominations

References

External links 
Official page

1986 births
Musicians from Kraków
Polish conductors (music)
Male conductors (music)
Polish jazz pianists
Living people
21st-century conductors (music)
21st-century pianists
21st-century male musicians
Male jazz musicians